Barzaj (also Romanized as Barzāj, Barzech, Barzach, and Barzich) is a village in Baqeran Rural District, in the Central District of Birjand County, South Khorasan Province, Iran. At the 2006 census, its population was 85, in 26 families.

References 

Populated places in Birjand County